Robert Gloton (1906–1986) was a French educator.

1906 births
1986 deaths
Educators from Paris
Place of birth missing
Place of death missing